Henry Paul "Hal" Walters (29 January 1892 – 7 September 1940) was a British actor. He was best known for his role in The Four Feathers (1939). He was killed by a bomb in an air raid during the London Blitz.

Selected filmography

 Just Plain Folks (1925)
 Mistaken Orders (1925) - Vince Barton
 Riding for Life (1925) - Bud Williams
 The Danger Zone (1925) - Jimmy Duff)
 Dangerous Traffic (1926) - Harvey Leonard
 West of the Law (1926) - Dick Walton
 Where North Holds Sway (1927) - Harvey Raine
 Tonight's the Night (1931) - Alf Hawkins
 Come Into My Parlour (1932) - Burglar
 Verdict of the Sea (1932) - Shorty
 The Last Coupon (1932) - Second in Boxing Match (uncredited)
 Old Spanish Customers (1932) - Fuller's partner in comic dance
 Little Fella (1932) - Dawes
 The River House Ghost (1932) - Walter
 Yes, Madam (1933) - Catlett
 That's My Wife (1933) - Bertie Griggs
 Going Straight (1933)
 Great Stuff (1933) - Spud
 Dora (1933, Short) - Newsagent
 Enemy of the Police (1933) - Bagshaw
 Strike It Rich (1933) - (uncredited)
 Marooned (1933) - Joe
 I'll Stick to You (1933) - Wilkins
 Keep It Quiet (1934) - Harry
 The Man I Want (1934) - Crook
 Virginia's Husband (1934) - Mechanic
 Big Business (1934) - Spike
 Crazy People (1934)
 The Man Who Knew Too Much (1934) - Postman (uncredited)
 The Perfect Flaw (1934) - Jennings
 Department Store (1935) - Sam
 The Right Age to Marry (1935) - Crowther
 Death on the Set (1935) - Albert
 A Fire Has Been Arranged (1935) - Hal
 Can You Hear Me, Mother? (1935) - Taxi Driver
 Blue Smoke (1935) - Stiffy Williams
 Mother, Don't Rush Me (1936) - Hal
 Music Hath Charms (1936) - Assistant to B.B.C. Dance Orchestra (uncredited)
 They Didn't Know (1936) - (uncredited)
 The Interrupted Honeymoon (1936) - Valet
 Where There's a Will (1936) - Nick
 Educated Evans (1936) - Nobby
 Sabotage (1936) - Man with Daughter at Aquarium (uncredited)
 Beauty and the Barge (1937) - George Porter
 Feather Your Nest (1937) - Man Outside Furniture Shop (uncredited)
 The Vulture (1937) - Stiffy Mason
 Pearls Bring Tears (1937) - Herbert
 Song of the Forge (1937) - Sam Tucker
 Strange Adventures of Mr. Smith (1937) - Lobby
 Keep Fit (1937) - Racing Tough
 Non-Stop New York (1937) - Porter (uncredited)
 Television Talent (1937) - Steve Bagley
 Little Miss Somebody (1937) - Albert Sims
 It's a Grand Old World (1937) - Jeff (uncredited)
 The Viper (1938) - Stiffy Mason
 Double or Quits (1938) - Alf
 Thank Evans (1938) - Nobby
 Meet Mr. Penny (1938) - Cecil
 Save a Little Sunshine (1938) - Stanley's Assistant (uncredited)
 Crackerjack (1938) - Smithy
 Everything Happens to Me (1938)
 Black Limelight (1939) - Rock Thrower (uncredited)
 Q Planes (1939) - Cornish Car Driver (uncredited)
 The Four Feathers (1939) - Joe
 A Girl Must Live (1939) - Barman at Party (uncredited)
 They Came by Night (1940) - Hopkins
 Hoots Mon! (1940) - Chips
 The Second Mr. Bush (1940) - Joe
 The Good Old Days (1940) - Titch
 Spies of the Air (1940) - Kingswell
 That's the Ticket (1940) - Nosey

References

External links
 

1892 births
1940 deaths
English male film actors
People from South Shields
Male actors from Tyne and Wear
20th-century English male actors
Deaths by airstrike during World War II
British civilians killed in World War II